Veera Parampare is a 2010 Indian Kannada-language action drama film written, produced and directed by S.Narayan under his home banner. The film stars Ambareesh, Sudeepa and Aindritha Ray in the lead roles. The soundtrack and background score are composed by Dharma Vish. The film was dubbed in Hindi as Nafrat Ki Aandhi in 2014.

Plot 
Teja is the adopted son of Varade Gowda, a village chieftain and demigod in their village, who is fighting for the villagers' rights to prevent their land getting usruped from the industrialists. However, Teja and Varade Gowda has to face a rivalry with Nanche Gowda's son Bhaire Gowda, whose father was killed by Varade Gowda, years ago for usruping the farmers' lands and is still continuing to usrup the land. Sapna, Varade Gowda's second daughter falls for Teja, who later recropriates her feelings.

One day, Varade Gowda's first daughter Gowri, marries a boy, and is thrown out of the house. Later, Teja finds that Gowri has committed suicide, where he visits her at the hospital, and learns that her boyfriend had duped her. Gowri request Teja to make Varade Gowda perform her funeral, to which he relucantly agrees. Teja manages to make Varade Gowda perform her funeral, without the latter's knowledge. After this, the police arrest Teja for Gowri's disappearance, where Varade Gowda also berates him. After Teja's arrest, a drunkard reveals about Teja's innocence, where Varade Gowda heads to the court to arrange a bail for Teja, but Bhaire Gowda's men attack Varade Gowda.

However, Varade Gowda manages to escape and gets admitted to the hospital. It is later revealed that Gowri's boyfriend is actually the son of Nanche Gowda's henchmen, who was also responsible for Teja's father's death (The man was actually killed by Teja in his childhood) and wanted to take revenge against Varade Gowda and Teja. Bhaire Gowda also supports him and planned everything to ruin Varade Gowda's family by separating Gowri and Teja. At the police custody, Teja learns from an officer that Bhaire Gowda has planned to eliminate Varade Gowda in the hospital. Enraged, Teja escapes from custody and reaches the hospital, where Teja, along with recovered Varade Gowda defeats Bhaire Gowda and Gowri's boyfriend. After this, Teja reunites with Varade Gowda.

Cast

 Ambareesh as Varade Gowda
 Sudeepa as Teja
 Aindritha Ray as Sapna, Varade Gowda's daughter
 Vijayalakshmi Singh as Almelu, Varade Gowda's wife
 Shobharaj as Teja's father
 Sharan as Sunil
 BV Bhaskar
 Hemashree

Production
The film started its regular shooting from 2 April in Gokak, Bijapur and nearby places.

Awards and nominations
58th Filmfare Awards South :-
Best Actress - Kannada - Nominated - Aindrita Ray
Best Supporting Actor - Kannada - Nominated - Ambareesh

Suvarna Film Awards :-
Best Actress - Nominated - Aindrita Ray

Soundtrack
The music for the film has been composed by the director S. Narayan himself. He has also penned down the lyrics for the soundtracks.

Critical reception
The film received mixed reviews from critics.

Rediff wrote "Veera Parampare has nothing extraordinary or new to offer, but Ambareesh and Sudeep fans won't be disappointed". Indiaglitz wrote "A mass entertainer 'Veera Parampare' [..] mesmerizes action lovers and fans of Ambarish and Sudeep".

References

External links 
 
 

2010s Kannada-language films
2010 films
Films directed by S. Narayan
Films shot in Bijapur, Karnataka